Xidu is a station on Line 5 of the Shanghai Metro. Located at Xizha Highway and Huhang Highway in the city's Fengxian District, the station is located on the main branch of Line 5 and opened as part of the southern extension of Line 5 on 30 December 2018. It is an elevated station.

North of this station, Line 5 trains travel on the lower deck of the Minpu Second Bridge over the Huangpu River into Minhang District.

References 

Railway stations in Shanghai
Shanghai Metro stations in Fengxian District
Railway stations in China opened in 2018
Line 5, Shanghai Metro